At the 1994 Jeux de la Francophonie, the athletics events were held in Bondoufle, near Paris, France. A total of 43 events were contested, of which 23 by male and 20 by female athletes.

Medal summary

Men

Women

Medal table

Participating nations

 (3)
 (4)
 (9)
 (2)
 (20)
 (62)
 (2)
 (12)
 (2)
 (4)
 (10)
 (23)
 (7)
 (7)
 (5)
 (80)
 (7)
 (9)
 (3)
 (6)
 (15)
 (4)
 (17)
 (5)
 (3)
 (16)
 (36)
 (13)
 (2)
 (45)
 (10)
 (10)
 (21)
 (6)
 (18)
 (4)
 (12)
 (4)
 (16)
 (3)

References
 GBRathletics

1994
Francophonie
Athletics
1994 Francophonie
1994 Francophonie
1994 Francophonie